The 2022 California State Board of Equalization elections took place on November 8, 2022, to elect all four seats of the State Board of Equalization, with the non-partisan blanket primary election taking place on June 7, 2022.

Overview

District 1

The incumbent is Republican Ted Gaines, who was elected in 2018 with 51.4% of the vote. He is running for reelection.

Candidates
Ted Gaines (R), incumbent Member of the Board of Equalization
 Braden Murphy (D), father
 Jose Altamirano (D), Business Operations Manager
 Nader Shahatit (D), Tax Consultant

Endorsements

Results

District 2

The incumbent is Democrat Malia Cohen, who was elected in 2018 with 72.8% of the vote. Cohen is running in the 2022 California State Controller election.

Candidates
 Michela Alioto-Pier (D), Member of the San Francisco Board of Supervisors (2004-2011), granddaughter of San Francisco Mayor Joseph Alioto  
 Peter Coe Verbica (R), Investment Advisor, Family donated heart of Henry Coe State Park, Chair of Investment Committee, San Jose Symphony Foundation
 Sally Lieber (D), Assemblymember 2002-2008

Endorsements

Results

District 3

The incumbent is Democrat Tony Vazquez, who was elected in 2018 with 69.9% of the vote. He is running for reelection.

Candidates
Tony Vazquez (D), incumbent Member of the Board of Equalization
John Mendoza (D)
Y. Marie Manvel (I)

Endorsements

Results

District 4

The incumbent is Democrat Mike Schaefer, who was elected in 2018 with 52.2% of the vote. He is running for reelection.

Candidates
Mike Schaefer (D), incumbent Member of the Board of Equalization
David Dodson (D), California State Board of Equalization, Supervisor
Denis R. Bilodeau (R), taxpayer advocate and engineer 
Erik Peterson (R), businessman and Huntington Beach Councilmember
John F. Kelly (R), small business owner
Matthew Harper (R), Mayor of Huntington Beach (2013-2014), Member of the California State Assembly, 74th district (2014-2018)
Randell R. Economy (R), small business owner

Endorsements

Results

References

External links
California Citizens Redistricting Commission Final Maps

Branden Murphy Campaign Website

David Dodson Campaign Website

State Board of Equalization
California state constitutional officer elections
California State Board of Equalization